Dime Box is an unincorporated community in Lee County, Texas, United States.  The Dime Box Independent School District serves area students and home to the Dime Box High School Longhorns.  It is named after what is now called Old Dime Box, Texas.

History
In 1913, the Southern Pacific Railroad built a line three miles southeast of the original location of Dime Box. Most of the residents and businesses moved to a site near the tracks. From that point onward, the original settlement became known as Old Dime Box and the new community was referred to as Dime Box.

Climate
The climate in this area is characterized by hot, humid summers; generally mild to cool winters; and precipitation evenly distributed throughout the year. The Köppen climate classification describes the weather as humid subtropical.

In fiction
Dime Box was cast as the capital of the Second Republic of Texas in Howard Waldrop's book Texas-Israeli War: 1999.

In popular culture

Dime Box was visited by author William Least Heat-Moon as described in his book Blue Highways. Heat-Moon got a haircut from local barber Claud Tyler.

Texas songwriter and musician Max Stalling recorded a song set in Dime Box, Texas.

The town gets a mention in the song "Northeast Texas Women" by Willis Alan Ramsey.

Season four, episode 9 of Walker, Texas Ranger featured Dime Box.

Dime Box is the setting for the 1973 movie Kid Blue starring Dennis Hopper.

The town is mentioned in a song by Jimmy Buffett.

Dime Box is the setting for several scenes in "The Return" and "The Eskimo Slugger", books from Brad Boney's "Austin Trilogy".

References

External links

 

Unincorporated communities in Texas
Unincorporated communities in Lee County, Texas